A Welsh Government sponsored body (WGSB) (CNLC) is a non-departmental public body directly funded by the Welsh Government.  Under the Government of Wales Act 1998 the bodies were sponsored by the National Assembly for Wales and were known as an Assembly sponsored public body, and this was changed by the Schedule 3 of the Wales Act 2017 which amended the Government of Wales Act 2006.

Welsh Government sponsored bodies undertake various functions on behalf of the Welsh Ministers, but operate independently of the Welsh Government. Corporate governance is performed by a chair and board for each sponsored body, who are appointed by Welsh ministers, in accordance with governance code established by the Commissioner for Public Appointments. The role and governance of sponsored bodies was stated by Ken Skates (Cabinet Secretary for Economy and Infrastructure), in a written statement to the National Assembly,

Sponsored bodies are subject to the Freedom of Information Act 2000, under Section 83, and have been given guidance by the Information Commissioner's Office on how they should exercise this responsibility.

List of public bodies

Executive WGSBs
Amgueddfa Cymru – National Museum Wales
Arts Council of Wales
Social Care Wales
Natural Resources Wales
Higher Education Funding Council for Wales
National Library of Wales
Royal Commission on the Ancient and Historical Monuments of Wales
Sport Wales
Qualifications Wales

Former executive WGSBs
These organisations have now been integrated into their respective departments.
ELWa – The National Council for Education and Training for Wales
Health Professions Wales
Qualifications, Curriculum and Assessment Authority for Wales
Wales Tourist Board
Welsh Development Agency
Welsh Language Board

Advisory WGSBs
 Agricultural Dwelling House Advisory Committee
 All Wales Medicines Strategy Group
 Ancient Monuments Board for Wales
 Historic Buildings Council for Wales
 Local Government Boundary Commission for Wales
 Social Services Inspectorate for Wales Advisory Group
 Welsh Centre for Post-Graduate Pharmaceutical Education
 Welsh Dental Committee
 Welsh Industrial Development Advisory Board
 Welsh Medical Committee
 Welsh Nursing and Midwifery Committee
 Welsh Optometric Committee
 Welsh Pharmaceutical Committee
 Welsh Scientific Advisory Committee

Tribunals
 Adjudication Panel Wales
Agricultural Land Tribunal
 Mental Health Review Tribunal for Wales
 Registered Inspectors of Schools Appeals Tribunal for Wales
Registered Nursery Education Inspectors Appeal Tribunal
Residential Property Tribunal Wales
 Rent Assessment Panel for Wales
 Special Educational Needs Tribunal
Valuation Tribunals (Wales)
 Welsh Language Tribunal

References

External links
Current list of Welsh Government sponsored bodies

 
Welsh Government